Easter term is the summer term at the University of Cambridge, University of Wales, Lampeter, University of Durham, and formerly University of Newcastle upon Tyne (before 2004), in the United Kingdom. It runs from April to June.

The expression is also used for the third term of the legal year in the Courts of England and Wales, many schools and other educational institutions.

See also
Epiphany term
Hilary term
Lent term
Michaelmas term
Summer term
Trinity term

References

Further reading
 
 

Academic terminology
Durham University
English law
Terminology of the University of Cambridge
Educational time organization